Day of Reckoning is the eleventh studio album by German thrash metal band Destruction. It was released on 18 February 2011 in Europe and 8 March 2011 in North America via Nuclear Blast. The first limited edition of the album does not have the band's logo on the booklet while the vinyl version and second pressing of the CD show a red Destruction logo on it.

This is the first album to feature their new drummer Vaaver. The first statements from the band are promising, for the oldschool fans, a more fast and turbulent album than the 2008 studio record D.E.V.O.L.U.T.I.O.N. that will go more 'back to the roots'. On 18 December 2010 in Portugal they played "Hate Is My Fuel" for the first time. Day of Reckoning sold over 800 copies in its first week in the U.S.

Track listing 
All songs written by Schmier and Sifringer, except track 12 written by Jimmy Bain and Ronnie James Dio.

Personnel 
Destruction
 Schmier – bass, vocals
 Mike Sifringer – guitars
 Wawrzyniec "Vaaver" Dramowicz – drums

Charts

References

External links 
 
  Day of Reckoning at Nuclear Blast

2011 albums
Destruction (band) albums